DR Update was a Danish 24-hour television news channel broadcast by DR. Although the channel was primarily distributed via the web, it was also available on regular broadcast television from the start on satellite from Canal Digital and from some community antennas. The programme content was updated between 07:00 and 23:00.

In January 2008, the Danish Parliament approved broadcast of the channel on the digital terrestrial network. The channel used frequency space which was used to simulcast news bulletins in sign language between in the early evening. DR Update broadcast round-the-clock, except between 17:00 and 20:00, when the space was used by sign language simulcasts. The terrestrial launch took place on 19 February 2008. With the terrestrial launch, the channel underwent slight changes by making the news loop six minutes long. From November 2009, DR Update later broadcast on its own channel. The sign language simulcasts were instead broadcast by DR Synstolkning, where it is on 24/7. In addition to digital terrestrial network, DR Update became available on the Viasat platform on 1 April 2008.

From 12 March 2008, the 12:00 and 15:00 editions of TV Avisen were replaced by DR Update. From 1 February 2011, DR Update also produced the news on DR1 at 17:50. A new studio, new graphics and a longer, 10-minute news loop were debuted on the same day.

DR Update was closed and replaced by DR Ultra on 4 March 2013.

Hosts 
 Lotte Thor
 Louise Bjerregaard
 Morten Schnell Lauritzen
 Louise Reumert
 Kasper Jessing
 Kristian Porsgaard
 Maria Yde

Management 
 Per Bjerre
 Lau Rabjerg-Eriksen

References 

Television stations in Denmark
Defunct television channels in Denmark
Television channels and stations established in 2007
Television channels and stations disestablished in 2013